BIHAMK or Bosanskohercegovački auto-moto klub (in English: Bosnia and Herzegovina Automobile and Motorcycle Club), as one of the three main Bosnian motoring clubs (along with AAMKBIH and AMSRS), is a local equivalent to the American AAA or British AA. BIHAMK continues the tradition of Bosnia-car racing-motorcycle association (Bosanskohercegovačko automobilističko društvo) founded 7 February 1946 and the Automobile Association of BiH (Auto-moto savez BiH) founded in 1947.

BIHAMK plays a special role in the field of public information about the condition of the roads in Bosnia and Herzegovina. It also provides technical assistance to drivers, issues International Driving Permits and other such documents for Bosnian drivers and publishes informative tourist brochures and maps for Bosnia and Herzegovina and Europe.

BIHAMK works in the field of traffic prevention and education, monitoring road safety, suggesting methodological improvements to relevant authorities and producing various manuals in the field of accident prevention notably.

The club enjoys reciprocal membership with many other European and international motoring clubs and encourages the development and improvement of motorsport within the international rules and norms.

International membership 
BIHAMK is a full member of:
 FIA - Fédération Internationale de l' Automobile 
 AIT - Alliance Internationale de Tourisme
 FIM - Fédération Internationale de Motocyclisme 
 EuroRAP - European Road Assessment organisation (since 2006.)
 ARC Europe - European Association of motoring clubs ( since 2007. participate in „Show your Card“ programme)

See also 
 FIA
 EuroRAP
 ARC Europe

References 

Automobile associations
Clubs and societies in Bosnia and Herzegovina
Emergency road services